Kenneth Chan Kai-tai (born 16 July 1964) is a Hong Kong actor and television host for Cable TV Hong Kong channel (previously working for TVB and ATV).

Career
Chan is an alumnus of St. Paul's Co-educational College, Fisher Park High School (where he sang in the school choir and performed in school productions such as 'Bye Bye Birdie') and Carleton University in Ottawa, Canada. He used to work at JPMorgan Chase as a Customer Service Supervisor and later joined an advertising company.

In 1990 he joined TVB to be the host of some TVB programmes. At the same time he also played a supporting role in some TV dramas. However, he generally failed to get a leading role in TVB. In 1998, ATV invited Chan to join the network with higher salary.

At ATV, Chan is best known as the host of Baak Maan Fu Yung, the Hong Kong version of Who Wants to Be a Millionaire?. The show boosted his career. He had also played three different characters in the three seasons of the My Date with a Vampire television series trilogy, in which each character is related by cloning or reincarnation of the original Yamamoto Kazuo in the first series.

In March 2009, ATV did not extend his contract thus Chan left ATV and joined CATV. In 2011, he returned to ATV but due to financial difficulties, ATV stopped producing enough TV programmes which lead to the decision to leave ATV again in 2013. Chan now is contracted with ViuTV.

Personal life
He was born in a rich family, living in a flat of Mid-levels. He has three elder brothers.
He became a Canadian citizen when he was two years old.
He married a piano teacher in April 1998. The couple has no children and lived in Kwun Tong.

Filmography

Television series

Discography

References

External links
 A Kenneth Chan fansite
 Official ATV profile

|-
! colspan="3" style="background: #DAA520;" | Power Academy Awards
|-

1964 births
Living people
Hong Kong male television actors
TVB actors
Asia Television
Cable television in Hong Kong
Who Wants to Be a Millionaire?
Carleton University alumni
Hong Kong emigrants to Canada
Hong Kong television presenters
Hong Kong television personalities
20th-century Hong Kong male actors
21st-century Hong Kong male actors
Alumni of St. Paul's Co-educational College